Martina Franca, or just Martina, is a town and municipality in the province of Taranto, Apulia, Italy. It is the second most populated town of the province after Taranto, and has a population (2016) of 49,086. Since 1975, the town has hosted the annual summer opera festival, the Festival della Valle d'Itria.

History

Geography
Located in Itria Valley, close to the provinces of Bari and Brindisi, Martina Franca borders with the municipalities of  Alberobello (BA), Ceglie Messapica (BR), Cisternino (BR), Crispiano, Massafra, Mottola, Locorotondo (BA), Ostuni (BR), Villa Castelli (BR), Grottaglie and Noci (BA). It counts the hamlets (frazioni) of Baratta, Capitolo, Cappuccini, Carpari, Gemma, Infarinata, Lamia Vecchia, Madonna dell'Arco, Monte Fellone, Monte Ilario, Montetulio, Monti del Duca, Motolese, Nigri, Ortolini, Papadomenico, Pergolo, Pianelle, San Paolo and Specchia Tarantina.

Culture
The opera Festival della Valle d'Itria is held annually in July/August. It presents a variety of rather unusual operas.

Economy
Agriculture is concentrated in the fertile lands in small valleys. The Viticulture is mainly based on white grape wine. There are also many olive trees growing, in fact olive oil is also one of the main product of the area.
The most common livestocks are sheep and goats, to which is added the breeding of thoroughbred "murgese" horses and the famous donkey of Martina Franca.
The most developed industry is the textile manufacturing, that made Martina famous also in the movie industry for a big international film in the 80's.
The services sector is characterized by banks, insurances and tourism, especially eno-gastronomic one. It is very common for tourists to visit oil mills, wine-making facilities and cellars to taste amazing local products. One of the most important culinary excellence is the "Capocollo Di Martina Franca"  a DOP quality product.

Main sights
The town has a particularly conserved old town surrounded by stone walls with prominent Baroque gates leading to piazzas and narrow, winding streets.
Piazza Roma is the largest square in the old town, with a green space in the centre of a largely triangular grass pattern, facing the 17th-century Palazzo Ducale.

Gastronomy

Martina Franca DOC
The comune of Martina Franca produces a white Denominazione di origine controllata (DOC) Italian wine that can be made in a still or sparkling Spumante style. The wine has a tendency not to age well, often turning from a light white color to a darker amber color and losing its fresh fruit flavors after only 3 to 4 years in the bottle. All grapes destined for DOC wine production needing to be harvested to a yield no greater than 13 tonnes/ha. The wine is made predominantly (50-65%) from Verdeca and Bianco d'Alessano which can make between 45-40% of the blend. Additional grapes are permitted up to a maximum of 5% including Bombino bianco, Fiano and Malvasia Toscana. The finished wine must attain a minimum alcohol level of 11% in order to be labelled with the Martina Franca DOC designation.

Sports
The town's football team is the A.S. Martina Franca 1947, which are currently plays in Lega Pro. Its home ground is the Gian Domenico Tursi Stadium. 
The Formula One driver Antonio Giovinazzi was born in Martina Franca.

The local futsal club is the LCF Martina. It was founded in 2009 and its home ground is the PalaWojtyla.

Transport
Martina Franca railway station in an important junction point between the lines Bari–Martina–Taranto and Martina–Lecce, both operated by the Ferrovie del Sud Est (FSE). A minor station on the line to Taranto, Martina Franca Colonne Grassi, is located in the southwestern suburb. Another minor stop, San Paolo, serves the homonym frazione.

References in popular culture 
In the novel Artemis Fowl by Eoin Colfer, Martina Franca is the setting of a troll attack.

Personalities
 Giuseppe Aprile (1732–1813), composer and castrato
 Pietro Carbotti, Venerable
 Domenico Carella (1721–1813), painter 
 Donato Carrisi (born 1973), thriller writer 
 Gioconda de Vito (1907–1994), violinist 
 Matteo Fischetti (1830–1887), pianist and composer
 Antonio Giovinazzi (born 1993), racing driver for Alfa Romeo in Formula One
 Paolo Grassi (Milan, 1919 – London, 1981), founder of the Piccolo Teatro di Milano and director of the Teatro alla Scala.
 Cosimo Damiano Lanza (Leporano, 1962), pianist, harpsichordist and composer. Director of the Accademia Musicale Mediterranea in Martina Franca. 
 Renzo Rubino (born 1988, Taranto), Singer-Songwriter, raised by parents of Martina Franca.
 Aldo Semerari (1923–1982), criminologist and suspected neo-fascist terrorist, who was born in Martina Franca. 
 Richard Sinclair (born 1948, Canterbury), English progressive rock musician, who lives in the countryside of Martina. 
 Rudolph Valentino (Castellaneta, 1895 – New York City, 1936), American actor. His father came from Martina Franca.

See also
Ghironda Festival, established in 1995
Itria Valley

References

Sources
 Jewish Virtual Library
 C. Colafemmina, Gli ebrei a Taranto (2005)
 N. Ferorelli, Gli Ebrei nell’Italia meridionale, dall’età romana al secolo XVIII

External links 

Official website  
  Website of the Festival della Valle d'Itria   
 Martina Franca on Flickr

 
Cities and towns in Apulia